The Procatopodini is an African tribe of fishes, it is part of the subfamily Procatopodinae, within the family Poeciliidae.

Genera
The following genera are classified within the tribe:

 Aapticheilichthys Huber, 2011
 Hypsopanchax Myers, 1924
 Laciris Huber, 1981 
 Lacustricola Myers, 1924 
 Lamprichthys Regan 1911
 Micropanchax Myers, 1924
 Pantanodon Myers, 1955
 Plataplochilus Ahl, 1928
 Platypanchax Ahl, 1928
 Poropanchax Clausen, 1967
 Procatopus Boulenger, 1904
 Rhexipanchax Huber, 1999

References

Poeciliidae